Parliamentary elections were held in Greece on , following elections in August. The Liberal Party won 307 of the 362 seats. Eleftherios Venizelos remained Prime Minister, having assumed office on 18 October.

Results

References

Greece
1910 11
1910 in Greece
1910s in Greek politics
History of Greece (1909–1924)
Greece
Legl